"Il mio sbaglio più grande" (English: My biggest mistake) is the second single of Italian singer Laura Pausini's Tra te e il mare.  The song is translated into Spanish under the title "Un error de los grandes". On her English-language album From the Inside, the song has an English version (which originated both the Italian and the Spanish versions) named "Every Day Is a Monday", which is also included on her greatest hits album 20 - The Greatest Hits.

Video
The music video of "Il mio sbaglio più grande" was shot in Milan and was directed by Marco Salom. The sister of Laura Pausini, Silvia Pausini makes a brief appearance in the video. The video shows Laura Pausini with her band on a stage in front of a live audience.

Track listing
Italian - Single
 "Il mio sbaglio più grande"
 "Il mio sbaglio più grande" (Instrumental Version)
 "Un error de los grandes"

Spanish - Single
 "Un error de los grandes"

Charts

References

Laura Pausini songs
2001 singles
Italian-language songs
Spanish-language songs
Songs written by Andreas Carlsson
2000 songs